Adam Hay (after 1684 – 15 November 1775) was a Scottish officer in the British Army and a politician who sat in the House of Commons between   1767 and 1775.

He was the second surviving of John Hay of Haystoun, sheriff-depute of Peebles.  His first marriage was to a Miss Britland of Nottingham. His second wife was Caroline Lucy Harpur, the daughter of Sir Henry Harpur, 5th Baronet and brother of  Sir Henry Harpur, 6th Baronet.

He was the Member of Parliament (MP) for Peeblesshire from 1767 to 1768, and from June 1775 until his death in November that year.  He was buried on 25 November 1775 at Calke, Derbyshire, the home of his second wife Caroline Lucy Harpur

References 
 

Year of birth unknown
1755 deaths
Royal Warwickshire Fusiliers officers
Members of the Parliament of Great Britain for Scottish constituencies
British MPs 1761–1768
British MPs 1774–1780
Year of birth uncertain
Royal Munster Fusiliers officers